Prehotep may refer to:

Prehotep I, vizier in the latter part of the reign of Ramesses II
Prehotep II, also vizier in the latter part of the reign of Ramesses II

Scholars disagree as to whether there were two viziers or just one with the name Prehotep.